The McKenzie River (in French: rivière McKenzie) is a tributary of the Bécancour River which is a tributary of the south shore of the St. Lawrence River. The McKenzie River flows through the municipalities of Laurierville, Saint-Pierre-Baptiste and Inverness, in the L'Érable Regional County Municipality (MRC), in the administrative region of Centre-du-Québec, in Quebec, in Canada.

Geography 

The main neighboring watersheds of the McKenzie River are:
 north side: Noire River;
 east side: Bécancour River;
 south side: Bécancour River, Golden stream;
 west side: Bécancour River, Noire River.

From its source, the McKenzie River flows on  divided into the following segments:
  eastward, in Laurierville, to the municipal limit of Saint-Pierre-Baptiste;
  eastward, in the municipality of Saint-Pierre-Baptiste;
  towards the south-east, jetting the boundary between the municipalities of Inverness and Saint-Pierre-Baptiste;
  eastward, passing south of Inverness, to its mouth.

The McKenzie River empties onto the west bank of the Bécancour River southeast of the village of Inverness.

Toponymy 

The toponym "McKenzie River" was made official on August 17, 1978, at the Commission de toponymie du Québec.

See also 
 List of rivers of Quebec

References 

Rivers of Chaudière-Appalaches
L'Érable Regional County Municipality
Rivers of Centre-du-Québec